Giessen, spelled Gießen in German, is a town in the German state (Bundesland) of Hesse, capital of both the district of Giessen and the administrative region of Giessen. The population is approximately 90,000, with roughly 37,000 university students.

The name comes from Giezzen, as it was first referred to in 1197, which refers to the position of the town between several rivers, lakes and streams. Giessen is also home to the University of Giessen.

In 1969, the town hosted the ninth Hessentag state festival.

History
Giessen came into being as a moated castle in 1152 built by Count Wilhelm von Gleiberg, although the history of the community in the northeast and in today's suburb called "Wieseck" dates back to 775. The town became part of Hesse-Marburg in 1567, passing to Hesse-Darmstadt in 1604. The University of Giessen was founded in 1607. Giessen was included within the Grand Duchy of Hesse created in 1806 during the Napoleonic Wars. After the First World War, it was part of the People's State of Hesse.

During the Second World War, a subcamp of the Buchenwald concentration camp was in the Heil- und Pflegeanstalt Licher Straße. Heavy bombing destroyed about 75 percent of Giessen in 1944, including most of the town's historic buildings. It became part of the modern state of Hesse after the war.

In 1977, Giessen was merged with the neighbouring city Wetzlar to form the new city of Lahn. However, this attempt to reorganize the administration was reversed in 1979. It was part of the Darmstadt region (regierungsbezirk) between 1945 and 1981, until the Giessen (region) was founded on 1 January 1981.

A U.S. military base was located in Giessen after the Second World War. The U.S. Army Garrison of Gießen had a population of up to 10,000 American soldiers and their families. Gießen was also the site of the central US army depot for all of Europe as well as the site of a special ammunition depot. The base is a converted German Army Air Field which is reflected in some of the buildings including the housing area. A theatre, known as the Keller Theatre, is a converted German Army Officers' Club. As of 28 September 2007, the Giessen Depot and all other U.S. facilities in the greater Giessen area were returned to local German authorities. The former U.S. Army buildings were used to house refugees after the large influx of 2016.

After the war, the city was twinned with Winchester, UK.

International relations

Giessen is twinned with:

Points of interest
 Akademischer Forstgarten Gießen, botanical gardens
 Botanischer Garten Gießen, established in 1609, is the oldest botanical garden in Germany still at its original location.
 Old Cemetery, (German: Alter Friedhof), is the resting place of Wilhelm Conrad Röntgen and Hugo von Ritgen.
 Liebig-Museum was established in 1920 to honor the chemist Justus von Liebig.
 Mathematikum was established in 2002, offering a wide variety of mathematical hands-on exhibits.
 University of Giessen
 Rubber Island is a residential area near the Lahn River.

Sport
Giessen is home to the basketball club Giessen 46ers, five-time champion of the Basketball Bundesliga. Its home games take place at the Sporthalle Gießen-Ost.
Also, Giessen has an American football team called Giessen Golden Dragons.

Religion
The Catholic Scouts of Europe were founded in Giessen in 1975.

Gallery

Notable people

 Samuel Adler (1809–1891), noted rabbi in the United States, attended the University of Giessen
 Annika Beck (born 1994), professional tennis player
 Stefan Bellof (1957–1985), Formula One and Sportscar driver, who was killed during a race held in Spa-Francorchamps
 Christa Blanke (born 1948), theologist, founder of Animals' Angels e.V.
 Volker Bouffier (born 1951), politician (CDU)
 Helge Braun (born 1972), politician (CDU)
 Georg Büchner (1813–1837) studied two years at the University of Gießen
 Daniel Davari (born 1988), Iranian footballer.
 Ernst Dieffenbach, born Johann Karl Ernst Dieffenbach (1811–1855), German physician, geologist and naturalist
 Georg Christian Dieffenbach (1822–1901), German poet and theologian
 Johann Friedrich Dieffenbach (1792–1847), German surgeon

 Walter Dornberger (1895–1980), rocket scientist
 Peter Düttmann (1923–2001), Luftwaffe Ace
 Landgravine Elisabeth Amalie of Hesse-Darmstadt (1635–1709), Electress Palatine
 Charles Friedek (born 1971), triple jumper, gold medallist at the 1999 World Championships in Athletics
 Jesko Friedrich (born 1974), comedy television actor and writer
 Adolph Hansen (1851–1920), botanist and professor at University of Giessen
 Fritz Pfeffer (1889–1944), dentist, hid in the Anne Frank House during WWII
 Fritz Heichelheim (1901–1968), economic historian
 August Wilhelm von Hofmann (1818–1892), chemist
 Juli, rock band
 Friedrich Kellner (1885–1970), Chief Regional Auditor in Giessen 1948–1950, and Chief Justice Inspector of Laubach, where he wrote his secret WWII diary.  The Holocaust Research Unit of Justus Liebig University of Giessen has established the Kellner Project
 Karl Kling (1910–2003), racing driver and head of Mercedes-Benz Motorsport
 Jonathan Koch (born 1985), rower
 Harald Lesch (born 1960), physicist, astronomer, natural philosopher, author, television presenter, professor of physics
 Chris Liebing (born 1968) techno/electronic music producer and DJ
 Justus von Liebig (1803–1873), chemist, professor. The official name of the University of Giessen is now Justus Liebig University
 Wilhelm Liebknecht (1826–1900), founder of the Social Democratic Party of Germany
 Sigmund Livingston (1872–1946), American lawyer, founder and first president of the Anti-Defamation League
 Christopher Ludwick (1720–1801) Baker General for the American Revolutionary War Army – Philadelphia
 Alfred Milner (1854–1925), British statesman
 Demis Nikolaidis (born 1973), Greek footballer
 James J. O'Donnell (born 1950), American scholar and university administrator, born in Giessen
 Albert Osswald (1919–1996), politician
 Wilhelm Conrad Röntgen (1845–1923), physicist, professor of physics from 1879 until 1888 at the University of Giessen. He was buried at the "Alte Friedhof", where his tomb can still be found
 Johann Georg Rosenmüller (1736–1815), professor of theology at the university
 Jochen Schropp (born 1978), German actor and television entertainer
 Til Schweiger (born 1968), actor, director and producer. Grew up, went to school and started studying in Giessen
 Wilhelm Sievers (1860–1921), geographer, explorer, professor at the university
 Henrietta Skelton (1839/1842–1900), social reformer, writer, organizer, lecturer
 Dieter Strack, retired German professional basketball player
 Marie Wittich (1868–1931), opera singer
 Willy Zschietzschmann (1900–1976), Classical archeologist and author

Education
 MBML: The International Graduate Programme "Molecular Biology and Medicine of the Lung" of the University of Giessen Lung Center
 University hospital Giessen und Marburg
 Mittelhessen University of Applied Sciences
 University of Giessen

Manisch
Manisch is a dialect of rotwelsch spoken in and around Giessen by people in lower income neighbourhoods, some of which are known as "Eulenkopf", "Gummiinsel", "Heyerweg" and "Margaretenhütte". Approximately 700–750 residents spoke the dialect fluently as of 1976. Although the dialect still influences the Giessen vernacular, it is nearly extinct in terms of fluent speakers.

Geography

Climate
Climate in this area has mild differences between highs and lows, and there is adequate rainfall year-round.  The Köppen Climate Classification subtype for this climate is "Cfb". (Marine West Coast Climate).

See also
 Giessen station
 Giessen 46ers — Basketball club
 Giessen emigration society — founded 1833

References
Notes

External links

 
 City Services Giessen (SWG)
 Express Magazine – Current events and news from Giessen

 
Grand Duchy of Hesse